Bornane (or camphane) is a compound closely related to norbornane.

Its name refers to Borneo, habitat of the tree Cinnamomum camphora from which bornane and related compounds can be extracted.

See also
 Camphor

Monoterpenes
Bicyclic compounds